Brotas is a Brazilian municipality located in the state of São Paulo. The population is 24,636 (2020 est.) in an area of 1101 km2. The town is known locally for its coffee, on which its economy relies.

History
The city's history started in 1839 when a chapel was built which originated a settlement around it. Brotas became a district of Araraquara in 1841, then it became a district of Rio Claro in 1853. On August 22, 1859, the district was promoted to a municipality.

The municipality experienced its greater development era during the coffee farming expansion which occurred between the 1920s and the 1930s. During this era the city received a large number of Italian immigrants. Due to the coffee agriculture decline, a large number of Brotas' citizens migrated to larger cities.

The municipality contains 44% of the Itirapina Ecological Station, created in 1984.

Economy
Despite its coffee-oriented historical economic development, Brotas is known internationally for its specialization in adventure tourism, hosting the practice of several adventurous sports such as rafting and canoeing, taking advantage of the Jacaré Pepira River.

Nowadays the municipality's economy based in farming and cattle raising, especially in the culture of sugar cane and orange, despite the growing relevance of adventure tourism.

The municipality contains the strictly protected Mata do Jacaré Ecological Station on the south bank of the reservoir formed by the Santana Dam on the Jacaré-Guaçu River, which separates the municipalities of Brotas and São Carlos.

The Brotas region, including the Patrimônio de São Sebastião neighborhood and the city of Torrinha, feature an elevated number of landforms of great interest for tourists.

References

External links
Brotas Online.com.br 
Brotas.com.br 
Visite Brotas 
Viaje Brotas 
Turismo em Brotas 

Municipalities in São Paulo (state)
Populated places established in 1839
1839 establishments in Brazil